Nelsson may refer to:

Anders Nelsson, actor and musician in the 1960s Hong Kong music scene
Putte Nelsson, (born 1971), Swedish pianist and songwriter
Victor Nelsson (born 1998), Danish professional footballer
Woldemar Nelsson (1938–2006), Russian conductor

See also
Nelsen (disambiguation)
Nelson (disambiguation)